Huayanay Airport,  is an airstrip  northwest of Ovalle, a city in the Coquimbo Region of Chile.

There are ravines on all sides close to the runway.

See also

Transport in Chile
List of airports in Chile

References

External links
OpenStreetMap - Huayanay
OurAirports - Huayanay
FallingRain - Huayanay Airport

Airports in Chile
Airports in Coquimbo Region